Hallo Hallo may refer to:

 Hallo Hallo (Ace of Base song), a 2000 Ace of Base single
 Hallo Hallo (Lonnie Devantier song), the Danish entry in the 1990 Eurovision Song Contest
 Hallo Hallo (Odd Nordstoga song), a song by Norwegian musician Odd Nordstoga
 Hallo Hallo, a song by German rappers Azet & Zuna

See also 
 'Allo 'Allo!, a British sitcom